The ARY Film Award for Best Editing or Film Editing is an ARY Film Award that is awarded each year to the best editors. It is one of eleven Technical Awarding category.

History
The Best Background Score category originates with the 1st ARY Film Awards ceremony since 2014. This category has been given to the best film editor for his/her work for the films of previous year to the ceremony held by Jury selection.

Winners and nominees
As of 2014, No nominations were made, winner selection and nomination were wholly made by AFAS Jury of Technical award.

2010s

2016

References

External links 

 ARY Film Awards Official website

ARY Film Award winners
ARY Film Awards